The Denmark women's national under–18 ice hockey team is the national under-18 ice hockey team of Denmark. The team represents Denmark at the International Ice Hockey Federation's World Women's U18 Division I Qualification.

World Women's U18 Championship record

^Includes one loss in extra time (in the preliminary round)

Ice hockey
Women's national under-18 ice hockey teams